Allan Vincent Johnston (23 July 1906 – 6 June 1944) was an Australian rules footballer who played for the Fitzroy Football Club in the Victorian Football League (VFL).

He was killed in a car accident near Wangaratta on 6 June 1944, which was caused by him sneezing while at the wheel.

Notes

External links 
		

1906 births
1944 deaths
Australian rules footballers from Victoria (Australia)
Fitzroy Football Club players
Road incident deaths in Victoria (Australia)